Pat's Uninteresting Tours was a series of themed route bus tours that offered an alternative to the usual sightseeing tours. Taking passengers on a four-hour comedy excursion to downmarket locations it operated in Sydney, Australia during the mid to late 1980s.

The premise was to conduct paying passengers on a bus and expose them to ordinary situations in incongruous contexts - actively avoiding normal tourist attractions and visiting uninteresting sites. These included wine tasting at a rubbish tip, "experiencing fresh air" at the sewage works and formal dinner at a road-side diner. Passengers were encouraged to dress in tourist garb for the day tours and tacky evening wear for night tours. After TV New Zealand program That's Fairly Interesting recorded a segment, tours were conducted in Wellington, Christchurch, Palmerston North and later Auckland.

Beginnings
Patrick McGeown created the concept in 1978 whilst serving on board the Royal Australian Navy warship HMAS Perth. After repeated trips to Hawaii, he began to lead alternative sightseeing events for other crewmates. Following the inaugural tour he then conducted tours in Darwin and Canberra before launching the concept as a business in Sydney on 17 March 1985.

Destinations
Each tour was unique and the four hours of improvisation and creativity took passengers to an assortment of locations. Some Sydney locations were:

 Various industry by day/night 
 Eastern Suburbs Crematorium 
 Long Bay Gaol 
 Malabar Sewerage Treatment Works
 Kings Cross red light district to sing Christmas Carols at El Alamein Fountain
 Downmarket pub
 Rubbish tip 
 Traffic roundabout
 Venereal Disease clinic 
 Macdonaldtown railway station
 The city morgue

References

Other media references:

 Fred Baker - Benelong "Perhaps it's another Pink Elephant" The Sunday Telegraph (Sydney), 20 March 1983
 Denise Shaw "Madcap Pat Bores Up Tourists" The Truth (newspaper), 27 July 1985 p. 3.
 John Elliot "Tedious Tours" Australian Penthouse January 1986 
 Judy O'Connor "Miracle of Turning Boredom into Cash" The Press Christchurch, 25 February 1988 p. 13.
 Willesee Channel 9 television.  27 March 1985. Reported by Howard Gipps.

External links
 Pat McGeown's description at his blog
 Article on Pat McGeown at The Pattaya Mail
 Listing attributing "Flash Mobs" to Pat's Uninteresting Tours via on-line Australian Dictionary
 Video from That's Fairly Interesting, New Zealand Television - July 1988 via YouTube
 Video from Willesee programme, 1985 via the Internet Archive

Tourism in Sydney
Comedy tours